Buckhurst Park may refer to:

In England:
Buckhurst Park, Berkshire, the seat of the Savory baronets
Buckhurst Park, East Sussex, the family seat of the Earls De La Warr

In Fiji:
ANZ National Stadium, a multipurpose stadium in Suva, Fiji, originally built in 1951 as Buckhurst Park
Buckhurst and Bidesi Parks, athletic playing grounds near Fiji's ANZ National Stadium